Ever the Silver Cord Be Loosed is the first studio album by the American psychedelic rock band Weird Owl, released by the label Tee Pee Records on February 17, 2009. The album was released following their 2007 EP entitled Nuclear Psychology.

Recording
The album was recorded in a studio over a short period of around five days, making use of instruments such as a Roland VK-7 electronic keyboard as well as instruments and amplifiers manufactured by Fender and Wurlitzer. The album's cover art was designed by Weird Owl's guitarist and lead vocalist, Trevor Tyrrell, alongside his wife.

Track listing

Personnel
 Trevor Tyrrell – guitar, lead vocals
 Jon Rudd – guitar
 Kenneth Cook – bass guitar, keyboards, synths, back-up vocals
 Sean Reynolds – drums
 John Cassidy – keyboards, synths

References

2009 debut albums
Weird Owl albums
Tee Pee Records albums